Utshimassits: Place of the Boss is a Canadian documentary film, directed by John Walker and released in 1996. The film focuses on Davis Inlet (Utshimassits), an Innu community in Labrador which was the site of a major humanitarian crisis in the 1990s, and explores how the community's roots as a forcible resettlement of the previously nomadic Mushuau Innu First Nation contributed to the crisis.

The film premiered on February 13, 1996 as an episode of the CBC Television documentary series Witness. At the 11th Gemini Awards, it won the Donald Brittain Award for best social or political documentary.

References

External links

1996 films
Donald Brittain Award winning shows
Films shot in Newfoundland and Labrador
National Film Board of Canada documentaries
Documentary films about First Nations
Canadian documentary television films
Films directed by John Walker
1990s English-language films
1990s Canadian films